Stef Broenink (born 19 September 1990) is a Dutch rower. He won the silver medal at the 2020 Summer Olympics  in the double sculls event together with Melvin Twellaar.

References

External links

1990 births
Living people
Dutch male rowers
Olympic rowers of the Netherlands
Rowers at the 2020 Summer Olympics
Sportspeople from Leiden
Universiade bronze medalists for the Netherlands
Universiade medalists in rowing
Medalists at the 2013 Summer Universiade
European Rowing Championships medalists
Medalists at the 2020 Summer Olympics
Olympic medalists in rowing
Olympic silver medalists for the Netherlands